Jonathan "Jon" Ford (born September 15, 1972) is a Republican member of the Indiana State Senate, representing District 38. He was first elected to the Indiana Senate in 2014, where he defeated the 12-year incumbent Timothy Skinner. Before running for office Ford was the president of All State Manufacturing. His main goal was to "focus on building the Wabash Valley's reputation as a quality place to study, work and live." Ford was a member of the Honey Creek Township Board. He was also the president of the Swope Art Museum and the Indiana Leadership Forum.

Political career

2015 legislative session 
During the 2015 Indiana General Assembly Session Ford was on the following committees; Family & Children Services, Homeland Security & Transportation, Public Policy, and Veterans Affairs & the Military

Indiana Senate District 38
District 38 consists of all of Vigo County and the upper portion of Clay County. As of the 2010 census, a total of 128,449 civilians reside within Indiana's 38th Senate District.

References

Living people
Place of birth missing (living people)
1972 births
Republican Party Indiana state senators
21st-century American politicians